Ludwig Streicher (26 June 1920 – 11 March 2003) was a contrabassist from Vienna, Austria. Familiar to many as the former principal bass of the Vienna Philharmonic Orchestra and bass soloist, he is also known as an instructor and as the author of a contrabass textbook.

Early life 
Streicher's love for music (which he called Musizieren) was influenced by his father. His parents owned an inn located in Ziersdorf, Lower Austria. There, his father led a local brass band. His father gave Streicher his first violin lessons.

Career
At age 14, he attended Vienna Music Academy, switching to double bass. He studied with students of Franz Simandl, a famous double bass soloist. Streicher graduated in 1940 and spent the next four years serving as principal bass at the Kraków National Theater. He was suddenly conscripted by the German Wehrmacht, which was followed by Russian imprisonment. In 1945, he escaped on foot and joined the Vienna Philharmonic, spending 19 years (1954 - 1973) as principal. During this time, he claimed to have hitched a ride in a Russian tank to audition for the Orchestra of the Vienna State Opera. In April of 1966, he gave his first solo concert in Wels. The raging success took him to the Middle East, America, Africa, Japan, Korea, and Taiwan. As a soloist he recorded pieces ranging from Carl Ditters von Dittersdorf's 18th century compositions to contemporary contrabass pieces. 

After the tour, Streicher devoted his time to instructing young students at the Vienna Musical Theater Academy and at the Escuela Superior de Música Reina Sofía (Queen Sofía College of Music) in Madrid.

References

1920 births
2003 deaths
Double-bassists
Male double-bassists
Austrian classical musicians
Academic staff of the Reina Sofía School of Music
Players of the Vienna Philharmonic
20th-century double-bassists
20th-century male musicians